The azure dollarbird (Eurystomus azureus) also known as the azure roller, purple dollarbird or purple roller, is a species of bird in the family Coraciidae. It is endemic to the Maluku Islands in Indonesia. Formerly, some authorities considered the azure dollarbird to be a subspecies of the oriental dollarbird.

A molecular phylogenetic study by Ulf Johansson and collaborators published in 2018 found that the azure dollarbird was nested in a clade containing subspecies of the Oriental dollarbird (Eurystomus orientalis).

Habitat 
The azure dollarbird's natural habitats are subtropical or tropical moist lowland forest and plantations. It is negatively affected by habitat loss. For some time, it was assumed to be decreasing in numbers quite rapidly and it was uplisted to Vulnerable in the 2000 IUCN Red List. However, more recently it was determined to be—although still declining—more common than previously believed and thus it has now been downlisted to Near Threatened in 2007.

Footnotes

References
 BirdLife International (2007a): [ 2006-2007 Red List status changes ]. Retrieved 2007-AUG-26.
 BirdLife International (2007b): Eurystomus azureus - BirdLife Species Factsheet. Retrieved 2007-AUG-26

azure dollarbird
Birds of the Maluku Islands
azure dollarbird
azure dollarbird
Taxonomy articles created by Polbot